Doabi is a dialect of the Punjabi language.  The dialect is named for the region in which it was historically spoken, Doaba (also known as Bist Doab); the word doab means "the land between two rivers" and this dialect was historically spoken in the doab between the Beas River and Sutlej River. Its occurrence in parts of Pakistani Punjab owes to post-1947 migration of Muslim populace from East Punjab.  The region it is now spoken includes: the Jalandhar, Hoshiarpur, Kapurthala and Nawanshahr districts of Indian Punjab, including  the areas known as the Dona and Manjki; and the Toba Tek Singh and Faisalabad districts of Pakistani Punjab  and some regions of una,Himachal Pradesh.

The sub dialects of Doabi include Dona and Manjki.

Analysis
The Doabi dialect in its eastern part blends with the Malwai dialect of Ludhiana district, and in its Northern side, it shares the linguistic features of  Pahari. Some of the linguistic Linguistic features of the Doabi dialect that separate it from other Punjabi dialects are as below:

Consonants
 
* does not occur word initially

Vowels

Doabi has ten vowels. These are 

For example:

Other suprasegmental phonemes

Tone, stress and nasalization in Doabi are phonemic.

Tone
Three tones are used in Doabi; low, mid and high. For example;

Stress
Stress in Doabi is realized in two ways, syntagmatically and paradigmatically.

Syntagmatically, stress-shift results in change of meaning. This kind of stress is often orthographically unmarked, and may shift any tone present in a word to the stressed syllable.

For example:

Paradigmatically, Doabi has stressed and unstressed syllables;

Some basic vocabulary items

Features

Substituting letters
Doabi's drop the letter "v" at the start of a word and use the letter "b" as in "Vada" (big) to "Bada". They also use the letter "o" elsewhere in a word instead of a "v" as in "Khvab" (dream) to "Khoaab". A distinctive feature of Doabi is the use of the "w" sound. Where "v" appears in the middle of a word in standard Punjabi, Doabis use "w" so that "hava" (wind) becomes "hawa". Also, the vowel "u" is pronounced with an "o". Accordingly, "khush" (happy) becomes "khosh" or "kuht" (to beat) becomes "koht". In Doabi, any word beginning with "i" is pronounced with "e". For example, the word "khich" (to pull) is pronounced as "khech" or the word "vich" (inside) is pronounced as "bech".

Doabis do not use "z" and therefore substitute "j". This is common in the Punjabi language as "z" is not indigenous to the area.

Sentence structure
Doabi's end sentences with "aa" (present tense) and "sigey" (past —tense), instead of "han" (present tense) and "san" or "si" (past tense). "Aiddan", "Jiddan", "Kiddan" are all commonly used adverbs in Doabi as opposed to the "Aistaran/Enj," "Jistaran/Jivven," and "Kistaran/Kivven," used in Punjabi's prestige dialect, Majhi.

Present Tense: Usage of aa (sing.) and aa (plu.)

Examples:

Past Tense: Uninflected sī, or number- and gender-inflected sīgā/sīgī/sīge/sīgīā, in Doabi

Examples:

Vocabulary

See also 
 Languages of Pakistan
 Languages of India
 List of Indian languages by total speakers
 Malwi dialect
 Puadhi language

References 

Languages of Punjab, Pakistan
Languages of Punjab, India
Languages of India
Punjabi culture
Punjabi dialects